The Marvel Cinematic Universe (MCU) is an American media franchise and shared universe centered on a series of superhero films produced by Marvel Studios. The films are based on characters that appear in American comic books published by Marvel Comics. The franchise also includes television series, short films, digital series, and literature. The shared universe, much like the original Marvel Universe in comic books, was established by crossing over common plot elements, settings, cast, and characters.

Marvel Studios releases its films in groups called "Phases", with the first three phases collectively known as "The Infinity Saga" and the following three phases as "The Multiverse Saga". The first MCU film, Iron Man (2008), began Phase One, which culminated in the 2012 crossover film The Avengers. Phase Two began with Iron Man 3 (2013) and concluded with Ant-Man (2015). Phase Three began with Captain America: Civil War (2016) and concluded with Spider-Man: Far From Home (2019). Phase Four began with Black Widow (2021) and concluded with Black Panther: Wakanda Forever (2022). Ant-Man and the Wasp: Quantumania (2023) began Phase Five, which will end with Blade (2024), and Phase Six will begin with Deadpool 3 (2024). Phase Six and "The Multiverse Saga" will conclude with Avengers: The Kang Dynasty (2025) and Avengers: Secret Wars (2026).

Marvel Television expanded the universe to network television with Agents of S.H.I.E.L.D. on ABC in 2013 before further expanding to streaming television on Netflix and Hulu and to cable television on Freeform. They also produced the digital series Agents of S.H.I.E.L.D.: Slingshot. Marvel Studios began producing their own television series for streaming on Disney+, starting with WandaVision in 2021 as the beginning of Phase Four. They also expanded to television specials in Phase Four, known as Marvel Studios Special Presentations, the first of which was Werewolf by Night (2022). The MCU also includes tie-in comics published by Marvel Comics, a series of direct-to-video short films called Marvel One-Shots, and viral marketing campaigns for the films featuring the faux news programs WHIH Newsfront and The Daily Bugle.

The franchise has been commercially successful, becoming one of the highest-grossing media franchises of all time, and generally received positive reviews. It has inspired other film and television studios to attempt similar shared universes, and has also inspired several themed attractions, an art exhibit, television specials, literary material, multiple tie-in video games, and commercials.

Development

Films and Disney+ series 

By 2005, Marvel Entertainment had begun planning to produce its own films independently and distribute them through Paramount Pictures. Previously, Marvel had co-produced several superhero films with Columbia Pictures, New Line Cinema and others, including a seven-year development deal with 20th Century Fox. Marvel made relatively little profit from its licensing deals with other studios and wanted to get more money out of its films while maintaining artistic control of the projects and distribution. Avi Arad, head of Marvel's film division, was pleased with Sam Raimi's Spider-Man films at Sony Pictures, but was less pleased with others. As a result, Arad decided to form Marvel Studios, Hollywood's first major independent film studio since DreamWorks Pictures. Kevin Feige, Arad's second-in-command, realized that unlike Spider-Man and the X-Men, whose film rights were licensed to Sony and Fox, respectively, Marvel still owned the rights to the core members of the Avengers. Feige, a self-described "fanboy", envisioned creating a shared universe, just as creators Stan Lee and Jack Kirby had done with their comic books in the early 1960s.

To raise capital, the studio secured funding from a seven-year, $525 million revolving credit facility with Merrill Lynch. Marvel's plan was to release individual films for their main characters and then merge them in a crossover film. Arad doubted the strategy, but insisted that it was his reputation that helped secure the initial financing. He resigned the following year. In 2007, at 33 years old, Feige was named studio chief. In order to preserve its artistic integrity, Marvel Studios formed a creative committee of six people familiar with its comic book lore: Feige, Marvel Studios co-president Louis D'Esposito, Marvel Comics' president of publishing Dan Buckley, Marvel's chief creative officer Joe Quesada, writer Brian Michael Bendis, and Marvel Entertainment president Alan Fine, who oversaw the committee. Feige initially referred to the shared narrative continuity of these films as the "Marvel Cinema Universe", but later used the term "Marvel Cinematic Universe". Since the franchise expanded to other media, this phrase has been used by some to refer to the feature films only.

In October 2014, Marvel Studios held a press event to announce the titles of their Phase Three films. By September 2015, after Marvel Studios was integrated into Walt Disney Studios with Feige reporting to Walt Disney Studios chairman Alan F. Horn instead of Marvel Entertainment CEO Isaac Perlmutter, the studios' creative committee had "nominal" input on the films moving forward, though they continued to consult on Marvel Television productions, which remained under Perlmutter's control. All key film decisions going forward were to be made by Feige, D'Esposito and Victoria Alonso. Feige mentioned that Avengers: Endgame (2019) would provide "a definitive end" to the films and storylines preceding it, with the franchise having "two distinct periods. Everything before [Endgame] and everything after". He later said Phase Three would conclude "The Infinity Saga".

By November 2017, Disney was looking to develop a new Marvel television series for their streaming service Disney+. In July 2018, Feige noted discussions had begun with Disney regarding any potential involvement Marvel Studios could have with the streaming service, since Feige felt the service was "an important thing for the company". In September 2018, it was reported that Marvel Studios was developing several limited series centered on "second-tier" characters from the MCU films who had not and were unlikely to star in their own films. Each series was expected to be six to eight episodes, and would be produced by Marvel Studios rather than Marvel Television, with Feige taking a "hands-on role" in each series' development. Feige noted the series being developed for the streaming service would "tell stories... that we wouldn't be able to tell in a theatrical experience – a longer-form narrative". He also added that being asked by Disney to create these series "energized everyone creatively" within Marvel Studios, since they "could play in a new medium and throw the rules out the window in terms of structure and format". The Guardians of the Galaxy Holiday Special (2022), a Marvel Studios Special Presentation, was the first piece of content Marvel Studios planned to create for Disney+.

In July 2019, Feige announced the Phase Four slate at San Diego Comic-Con, consisting of films and, for the first time, television event series on Disney+. The Phase Four slate includes What If...?, the first animated series from Marvel Studios, and by July 2021 the studio was creating an "animation branch and mini studio", known as Marvel Studios Animation, to focus on more animated content beyond What If...?. In April 2022, Feige said he and Marvel Studios were on a creative retreat to plan and discuss the MCU films for the following 10 years. That July, Feige announced some of the films and series for Phase Five and Phase Six at San Diego Comic-Con, revealing that the second three Phases were collectively known as "The Multiverse Saga". Feige explained that Marvel Studios realized during development on Phase Four that it would be different from the first three phases, with more projects over a shorter period of time. This also came after the "creative experience" of ending Phase Three and "The Infinity Saga" with Avengers: Infinity War (2018) and Avengers: Endgame. Therefore, instead of "culminat[ing] every 10 months in an Avengers movie" they decided to leave that culmination until the end of "The Multiverse Saga", with the second three phases all building to Avengers: The Kang Dynasty and Avengers: Secret Wars (2026). Marvel Studios was excited to explore Kang the Conqueror as an overarching villain of the Multiverse Saga after Thanos in the Infinity Saga, because Kang was a uniquely different villain in part because he has multiple variants. Television specials from the studio are marketed as "Marvel Studios Special Presentations".

In December 2017, the Walt Disney Company agreed to acquire assets from 21st Century Fox, including 20th Century Fox. The transaction officially closed on March 19, 2019. The acquisition saw the return of the film rights of Deadpool, the X-Men characters, and the Fantastic Four characters to Marvel Studios, which would "create richer, more complex worlds of inter-related characters and stories". Some of the first elements previously controlled by 20th Century Fox to be integrated into the MCU were the organization S.W.O.R.D. in the Disney+ series WandaVision and the fictional country Madripoor in the series The Falcon and the Winter Soldier. Additionally, Patrick Stewart appeared as Earth-838 Professor Charles Xavier in Doctor Strange in the Multiverse of Madness (2022), portraying a different version of the character that he previously played in 20th Century Fox's X-Men film series, while Kamala Khan was revealed to have a genetic mutation in Ms. Marvel, with star Iman Vellani confirming she was the first mutant in the MCU. Namor is also revealed to be a mutant in Black Panther: Wakanda Forever (2022) as he is in the comics.

Marvel Television 

In June 2010, Marvel Television was launched with Jeph Loeb as head. By July 2012, Marvel Television had entered into discussions with ABC to create a show set in the MCU; the network ultimately created the series Agents of S.H.I.E.L.D., Agent Carter, and Inhumans, which was a co-production with IMAX Corporation. In November 2013, Disney was set to provide Netflix with the live-action series Daredevil, Jessica Jones, Luke Cage, and Iron Fist, leading up to the miniseries The Defenders. In April 2016, Netflix ordered The Punisher, a spin-off of Daredevil. By February 2019, Netflix had cancelled all of its Marvel series. In April 2016, the Disney-owned cable network Freeform announced Cloak & Dagger. In May 2017, Marvel announced that Runaways had received a series order from Hulu. In May 2019, Marvel announced that Helstrom had been greenlit for Hulu.

In October 2019, further corporate restructuring saw Feige named Chief Creative Officer of Marvel Entertainment, with Marvel Television becoming part of Marvel Studios and executives of Marvel Television reporting to Feige. In December 2019, Marvel Television was folded into Marvel Studios, with Marvel Studios taking over production of the current series at the time; no further series from Marvel Television were being considered for development. In January 2021, Feige said "never say never" to potentially reviving the Netflix series, but noted Marvel Studios was focused on their new Disney+ series announced at that time. In May 2022, it was revealed that Marvel Studios was developing a new Daredevil series for Disney+, which was announced in July as Daredevil: Born Again.

Other media expansion 
In 2008, the first tie-in comic was released. Quesada noted the comics would be set within the continuity of the films, but were not intended to be direct adaptions. Rather, they would explore "something that happened off screen" or flesh out something briefly mentioned. Feige was involved with the creation of the comics, with the film's screenwriters sometimes as well. Marvel Comics worked with Brad Winderbaum, Jeremy Latcham, and Will Corona Pilgrim at Marvel Studios to decide which concepts should be carried over from the Marvel Comics Universe to the Marvel Cinematic Universe, what to show in the tie-in comics, and what to leave for the films. Marvel has clarified which of the tie-in comics are considered canonical MCU stories, with the rest merely inspired by the MCU, "where we get to show off all the characters from the film in costume and in comic form".

In August 2011, Marvel announced a series of direct-to-video short films called Marvel One-Shots, the name derived from the label used by Marvel Comics for their one-shot comics. Co-producer Brad Winderbaum called the short films "a fun way to experiment with new characters and ideas" and to expand the MCU. Each short film is designed to be a self-contained story that provides more backstory for characters or events introduced in the films.

In March 2015, Marvel's Vice President of Animation Development and Production, Cort Lane, stated that animated tie-ins to the MCU were "in the works". That July, Marvel Studios partnered with Google to produce the faux news program WHIH Newsfront with Christine Everhart, a series of in-universe YouTube videos serving as the center of a viral marketing campaign to promote the films and universe. In December 2016, a six-part web series, Agents of S.H.I.E.L.D.: Slingshot, was revealed, which debuted on ABC.com on December 13, 2016. It follows Elena "Yo-Yo" Rodriguez on a secret mission, shortly before the start of Agents of S.H.I.E.L.D. fourth season, with Natalia Cordova-Buckley reprising her role. In September 2019, Sony created a real version of the fictional The Daily Bugle website as part of a viral marketing campaign to promote the home media release of Spider-Man: Far From Home (2019). Inspired by real-world "conspiracy-pushing" websites such as that of Alex Jones, the website features J. K. Simmons reprising his role as J. Jonah Jameson in a video where he speaks out against Spider-Man before asking viewers to "like and subscribe". In December 2020, Marvel Studios announced I Am Groot, a series of photorealistic animated shorts starring Baby Groot for Disney+.

Business practices 

Marvel Studios often puts together a "lookbook" of influences from the comics and art by Marvel's visual development department, to create a visual template for a project. These are put together at company retreats, which the studio holds every "18 months or so" to plan out and develop the phases of the MCU. These lookbooks are not always shown to directors, though, with Marvel sometimes preferring to let the director offer their own ideas first. When choosing a director for a project, Marvel Studios looks for filmmakers to hire who are able to guide a film, with some of their choices considered "out-of-left-field", given a director's previous work. Feige remarked, "You don't have to have directed a big, giant visual-effects movie to do a big, giant visual-effects movie for us. You just have to have done something singularly sort of awesome."

The studio ensures directors are open to the idea of the shared universe and are willing to include connective material, such as Kenneth Branagh and Joe Johnston needing to include Avengers set-up scenes in Thor and Captain America: The First Avenger, respectively. Marvel Studios usually has a big idea they would like to explore or build to in a project, such as Hydra infiltrating S.H.I.E.L.D. in Captain America: The Winter Soldier, with it up to the filmmakers to interpret and "improv a little bit" to get there. After these ideas have been developed, the creative team then begins to explore ideas happening in other future projects to see how to make any larger universe connections. There was large amount of collaboration between the Russo brothers and writers Christopher Markus and Stephen McFeely with the other Phase Three directors and writers to make sure "everything line[d] up right" for the MCU's "culmination" in Avengers: Infinity War and Avengers: Endgame.

Marvel Studios also began contracting their actors for multiple films, including signing actor Samuel L. Jackson to a then "unprecedented" nine-movie contract. Feige said the studio has all actors sign contracts for multiple films, with the norm being for three or more, and the nine or twelve film deals "more rare". The actors' contracts also feature clauses that allows Marvel to use up to three minutes of an actor's performance from one film in another, which Marvel describes as "bridging material". By the start of Phase Four, Marvel Studios was no longer contracting actors for a large number of projects, with deal lengths varying for each actor and project. Feige said the studio was looking for actors who were excited to join the franchise and appear in multiple projects without being locked into contractual obligations. He also noted that they were starting to include theme park attractions in actors' deals.

In August 2012, Marvel signed Joss Whedon to an exclusive contract through June 2015 for film and television. With the deal, Whedon would "contribute creatively" on Phase Two of the MCU and develop the first television series set in the universe. In April 2017, James Gunn revealed he would be working with Marvel "to help design where [the Guardians of the Galaxy characters'] stories go, and make sure the future of the Marvel Cosmic Universe is as special and authentic and magical as what we have created so far". In November 2022, Gunn became co-head of DC Studios, signing a deal for four years and to work exclusively on DC projects. By December 2020, because of the impact COVID-19 had on theaters and film studios shifting away from theatrical releases, Marvel Studios began exploring updated contracts for actors, writers, directors, and producers to receive adjusted compensation in the event a film had to debut on Disney+ instead of in theaters. TheWrap reported it was believed the new contracts would only apply to films about to enter production, and was unclear if any adjustments would be made to contracts for films already completed but not yet released.

For Marvel Television, Loeb explained that they saw themselves as producers providing support to the showrunner: "we're involved in every aspect of the production—whether it's being in the writers' room, editing on set, casting—every step of the production goes through the Marvel team to tell the best story that we can." He added that the studio is able to work on so many series across different networks and platforms because all they needed was one person from the studio working on each series to help "guide the process". Actors appearing in Marvel Television series, such as Charlie Cox (Matt Murdock / Daredevil in Daredevil) and Adrianne Palicki (Bobbi Morse / Mockingbird in Agents of S.H.I.E.L.D.), were contractually obliged to appear in a Marvel film if asked. When developing the crossover miniseries The Defenders, showrunner Marco Ramirez consulted with the creators of all the individual Marvel Netflix series, having them read each of the scripts for The Defenders and provide insight into individual characters' worlds. In December 2021, Feige confirmed that Cox would reprise the role of Daredevil in Marvel Studios MCU productions, with Cox first reprising the role in the film Spider-Man: No Way Home (2021). Additionally, D'Onofrio first reprises his role as Kingpin in the Disney+ series Hawkeye (2021).

Feature films 

Marvel Studios releases its films in groups called "Phases".

The Infinity Saga 

The first three phases are collectively known as "The Infinity Saga". Phase One consists of Iron Man (2008), The Incredible Hulk (2008), Iron Man 2 (2010), Thor (2011), and Captain America: The First Avenger (2011), and concludes with the crossover film The Avengers (2012). Phase Two comprises Iron Man 3 (2013), Thor: The Dark World (2013), Captain America: The Winter Soldier (2014), Guardians of the Galaxy (2014), Avengers: Age of Ultron (2015), and Ant-Man (2015). Captain America: Civil War (2016) is the first film of Phase Three, and is followed by Doctor Strange (2016), Guardians of the Galaxy Vol. 2 (2017), Spider-Man: Homecoming (2017), Thor: Ragnarok (2017), Black Panther (2018), Avengers: Infinity War (2018), Ant-Man and the Wasp (2018), Captain Marvel (2019), Avengers: Endgame (2019), and Spider-Man: Far From Home (2019).

The Multiverse Saga 

The second three phases are collectively known as "The Multiverse Saga", and include television series on Disney+. Phase Four includes Black Widow (2021), Shang-Chi and the Legend of the Ten Rings (2021), Eternals (2021), Spider-Man: No Way Home (2021), Doctor Strange in the Multiverse of Madness (2022), Thor: Love and Thunder (2022), and Black Panther: Wakanda Forever (2022). Phase Five begins with Ant-Man and the Wasp: Quantumania (2023), followed by Guardians of the Galaxy Vol. 3 (2023), The Marvels (2023), Captain America: New World Order (2024), Thunderbolts (2024), and Blade (2024). Phase Six begins with Deadpool 3 (2024), followed by Fantastic Four (2025), and will conclude with Avengers: The Kang Dynasty (2025) and Avengers: Secret Wars (2026).

Television series and specials

Marvel Television series 

Marvel Television produced multiple television series set in the MCU across broadcast, streaming, and cable. The "Marvel Heroes" series–Agents of S.H.I.E.L.D. (2013–2020), Agent Carter (2015–2016), and Inhumans (2017)–aired on ABC; the "Marvel Knights" series–Daredevil (2015–2018), Jessica Jones (2015–2019), Luke Cage (2016–2018), Iron Fist (2017–2018), the crossover miniseries The Defenders (2017), and The Punisher (2017–2019)–streamed on Netflix; young adult series included Runaways (2017–2019) streaming on Hulu and Cloak & Dagger (2018–2019) airing on Freeform; and the Hulu series Helstrom (2020) was originally intended to be the start of a planned "Adventure into Fear" franchise. Upon Helstrom release, showrunner Paul Zbyszewski noted the series was "not tied to the MCU".

Marvel Studios series 

Beginning with Phase Four, television series, which released on Disney+, were included as part of the Phases in addition to their feature films. Phase Four includes the series WandaVision (2021), The Falcon and the Winter Soldier (2021), the first season of Loki (2021), the first season of the animated series What If...? (2021), Hawkeye (2021), Moon Knight (2022), Ms. Marvel (2022), and She-Hulk: Attorney at Law (2022). The television specials Werewolf by Night (2022) and The Guardians of the Galaxy Holiday Special (2022) are also included in the phase. Phase Five includes Secret Invasion (2023), the second season of Loki (2023), the second season of What If...? (TBD), Ironheart (TBD), Echo (TBD), Agatha: Coven of Chaos (2023), and Daredevil: Born Again (2024).

Short films

Marvel One-Shots 

Marvel One-Shots are a series of direct-to-video short films that are included as special features in the MCU films' Blu-ray and digital distribution releases. The films included The Consultant (2011), A Funny Thing Happened on the Way to Thor's Hammer (2011), Item 47 (2012), Agent Carter (2013), and All Hail the King (2014).

Following the One-Shots becoming available on Disney+ in January 2022, Marvel classified the Team Thor mockumentary shorts as One-Shots. Team Thor is a series of direct-to-video mockumentary short films that were released from 2016 to 2018, consisting of Team Thor, Team Thor: Part 2, and Team Darryl, all written and directed by Taika Waititi.

I Am Groot 

I Am Groot is a series of photorealistic animated short films for Disney+ starring Baby Groot going on adventures with new and unusual characters. Vin Diesel reprises his role, with five shorts releasing on August 10, 2022. Five additional shorts are in development.

Other media

Digital series 
WHIH Newsfront (2015–16) is an in-universe current affairs show that serves as a viral marketing campaign for some of the MCU films, created in partnership with Google for YouTube. The campaign is an extension of the fictional news network WHIH World News, which is seen reporting on major events in many MCU films and television series. Leslie Bibb reprises her role as Christine Everhart from the Iron Man films.

Agents of S.H.I.E.L.D.: Slingshot (2016) is a digital series created for ABC.com and produced by Marvel Television that is a supplement to Agents of S.H.I.E.L.D., with the main cast reprising their roles.

The first two seasons of The Daily Bugle (2019–present) are an in-universe current affairs show serving as viral marketing campaign for the films Spider-Man: Far From Home and Spider-Man: No Way Home, with the videos released on YouTube and TikTok. It is based on the fictional sensationalist news outlet of the same name that appears in the MCU—itself based on the fictional newspaper agency of the same name appearing in several Marvel Comics publications. J. K. Simmons and Angourie Rice reprise their roles as J. Jonah Jameson and Betty Brant from the Spider-Man films.

Comic books 

Multiple limited series or one-shot comics have been published by Marvel Comics that tie-into the MCU films and television series. They are intended to tell additional stories about existing characters, or to make connections between MCU projects, without necessarily expanding the universe or introducing new concepts or characters.

Books 

The Wakanda Files: A Technological Exploration of the Avengers and Beyond is "a collection of papers, articles, blueprints, and notes amassed throughout history by Wakanda's War Dogs" at the request of Shuri. It is organized by areas of study and covers the technological advancements throughout the Marvel Cinematic Universe. The book, which exists in-universe, was written by Troy Benjamin and published by Epic Ink and Quarto Publishing Group. The Wakanda Files has content printed with UV ink that can be viewed with Kimoyo bead–shaped UV lights included with the book. It was released on October 20, 2020.

Look Out for the Little Guy, the fictional memoir written by Scott Lang as seen in Ant-Man and the Wasp: Quantumania, will be available from Hyperion Avenue on September 5, 2023. It was created alongside Marvel Studios and the Quantumania filmmakers, and was written by Rob Kutner, featuring "over 20 short pieces exploring different aspects of Scott's experiences" as a father and Avenger. Loveness wrote the material from the memoir that was featured in the film.

Music 

Various composers have created the film and television scores of the MCU films, television series, One-Shots, Special Presentations, and other related projects of the MCU. Original songs have also been created specifically for use in the franchise, while Brian Tyler and Michael Giacchino have both scored fanfares for the Marvel Studios production logo.

Timeline

As depicted in the MCU 

During Phase One of the MCU, Marvel Studios lined up some of their films' stories with references to one another, though they had no long-term plan for the shared universe's timeline at that point. Iron Man 2 is set six months after the events of Iron Man, and around the same time as Thor according to comments made by Nick Fury. Several of Marvel's One-Shot films also occur around the events of Phase One films, including The Consultant (set after the events of Iron Man 2 and The Incredible Hulk), A Funny Thing Happened on the Way to Thor's Hammer (set before the events of Thor), Item 47 (set after The Avengers), and Agent Carter (set one year after the events of Captain America: The First Avenger).

Wanting to simplify the in-universe timeline, the Phase Two films were set roughly in real time relating to The Avengers: Iron Man 3 takes place about six months later, during Christmas; Thor: The Dark World is set one year later; and Captain America: The Winter Soldier is two years after. Avengers: Age of Ultron and Ant-Man ended the phase in 2015, with several months passing between those films in-universe as in real life. The One-Shot All Hail the King is set after the events of Iron Man 3.

For Phase Three, directors the Russo brothers wanted to continue using real time, and so Captain America: Civil War begins a year after Age of Ultron, with Avengers: Infinity War set two years after that. Producer Brad Winderbaum said the Phase Three films would actually "happen on top of each other" while being less "interlocked" as the Phase One films were, with Black Panther and Spider-Man: Homecoming respectively beginning a week and several months after Civil War; Thor: Ragnarok beginning four years after The Dark World and two years after Age of Ultron, around the same time as Civil War and Homecoming; Doctor Strange taking place over a whole year and ending in late 2016, "up to date with the rest of the MCU"; Ant-Man and the Wasp also set two years after Civil War and shortly before Infinity War; and both Guardians of the Galaxy and its sequel Vol. 2 being explicitly set in 2014, which Feige believed would create a four-year gap between Vol. 2 and Infinity War, though the other MCU films up to that point do not specify years onscreen. Following Infinity War, the Russo brothers said future films would not necessarily be set according to real time as there are "a lot of very inventive ways of where the story can go from here", with both Ant-Man and the Wasp and Captain Marvel set earlier in the timeline; the latter is set in 1995. Avengers: Endgame begins shortly after Infinity War and ends in 2023 after a five-year time jump. It confirms dates for several of the other films, including The Avengers in 2012, Thor: The Dark World in 2013, Guardians of the Galaxy in 2014, Doctor Strange around 2017, and Ant-Man and the Wasp in 2018 before Infinity War. Spider-Man: Far From Home begins eight months after Endgame in 2024.

With Phase Four, Marvel Studios expanded into television series, which have greater interconnectivity with the MCU feature films than the series from Marvel Television. Many of the properties in the Phase are set after the events of Avengers: Endgame. WandaVision is set three weeks after the events of that film, and directly sets up Doctor Strange in the Multiverse of Madness; The Falcon and the Winter Soldier is set six months after Endgame. Shang-Chi and the Legend of the Ten Rings is also set after Endgame during the days leading to the Qingming Festival in early April, with She-Hulk: Attorney at Law set "a relatively short amount of time" after Shang-Chi. Eternals takes place around the same time as The Falcon and the Winter Soldier and Spider-Man: Far From Home, six to eight months after Endgame in 2024, while Spider-Man: No Way Home begins immediately after Far From Home, and continues over late 2024. Hawkeye takes place one year after the events of Endgame during the 2024 Christmas season.

Moon Knight is set after Hawkeye in early 2025, while Multiverse of Madness is set after Spider-Man: No Way Home. Ms. Marvel is set after Moon Knight, one to two years after Endgame. Thor: Love and Thunder is set after Endgame, eight and a half years after Thor broke up with Jane Foster, which had occurred by Ragnarok, and "a few weeks" since Thor joined the Guardians of the Galaxy. According to producer Nate Moore, Black Panther: Wakanda Forever is set after No Way Home and Eternals, "potentially concurrent" with Love and Thunder and Ant-Man and the Wasp: Quantumania, though it was placed earlier in the timeline between Moon Knight and She-Hulk: Attorney at Law with its addition to Disney+. The Guardians of the Galaxy Holiday Special is set "a fairly long time" after the events of Love and Thunder and before the events of Guardians of the Galaxy Vol. 3.

The first season of Loki continues from the 2012 events seen in Endgame, but much of the series exists outside of time and space given the introduction of the Time Variance Authority. What If...? is set after Loki first season finale, exploring the various branching timelines of the newly created multiverse in which major moments from the MCU films occur differently. Black Widow is set between Civil War and Infinity War, mostly taking place between the main plot of Civil War and its final scene. The I Am Groot shorts are set between the end of Guardians of the Galaxy and the start of Guardians of the Galaxy Vol. 2, and the end of Vol. 2 and its mid-credits scene. The special Werewolf by Night exists within the MCU but does not state "when, how or why". The director Michael Giacchino has "a very specific idea" of how the special fits into the MCU that had not been discussed with Marvel Studios.

In Phase Five, Ant-Man and the Wasp: Quantumania is set in 2025, around the same time as the events of Black Panther: Wakanda Forever and the beginning of Ms. Marvel. Secret Invasion is set after the events of Far From Home.

Codifying attempts 

The official canon tie-in comic Fury's Big Week confirmed that The Incredible Hulk, Iron Man 2, and Thor all took place within a week, a year before the crossover film The Avengers. Writers Christopher Yost and Eric Pearson tried to follow the logic of the films' timeline when plotting the comic, and received "the seal of approval" from Feige and Marvel Studios on the final timeline. As promotion for The Avengers, Marvel released an official infographic detailing this timeline in May 2012.

When Spider-Man: Homecoming was being developed, director and co-writer Jon Watts was shown a scroll detailing the MCU timeline that was created by co-producer Eric Carroll when he first began working for Marvel Studios. Watts said the scroll included both where the continuity of the films lined-up and did not lineup, and when fully unfurled it extended beyond the length of a long conference table. This scroll was used as the basis to weave the continuity of Homecoming into the previous films, such as The Avengers. This was labeled in the film with a title card stating that eight years pass between the end of The Avengers and the events of Civil War, which was widely criticized as a continuity error that broke the established MCU timeline, in which only four years should have passed. Additionally, dialogue in Civil War indicates that eight years pass between the end of Iron Man and the events of that film, despite the established continuity being closer to five or six years. Infinity War co-director Joe Russo described the Homecoming eight years time jump as "very incorrect", and the mistake was ignored in Infinity War which specified that its events were taking place only six years after The Avengers. The public response to the Homecoming mistake inspired Marvel Studios to release a new timeline for all three phases, and in November 2018, a timeline, specifying dates for the events in each film released to that point, was included as part of the sourcebook Marvel Studios: The First 10 Years, celebrating the 10-year anniversary of the MCU.

This timeline ignores the two "eight-year" continuity errors, but also contradicts the events of Black Panther and Infinity War by placing them in 2017. Despite the latter apparent mistakes, Thomas Bacon of Screen Rant described the timeline as "the closest Marvel has yet come to making an official statement on just when the different MCU events are set", bringing "some sense of balance to the MCU continuity".

In October 2020, the Marvel section of Disney+ was restructured to include groupings of the films by phase, as well as a grouping that put the films in timeline order. Bacon felt the placement of Thor: The Dark World between The Avengers and Iron Man 3 and Black Panther after Captain America: Civil War in this timeline corrected "previous issues" with their placement in the November 2018 First 10 Years timeline, and was glad Disney and Marvel "recognize[d] it's possible to watch these movies in anything other than release order", "legitimiz[ing]" this viewing experience. The Incredible Hulk, Spider-Man: Homecoming, and Spider-Man: Far From Home were excluded since Disney did not have their distribution rights, but Bacon felt The Incredible Hulk could be viewed after Iron Man 2 since it is simultaneous with that film, Homecoming could come after Black Panther, and Far From Home could be viewed after Avengers: Endgame. Julia Alexander at The Verge agreed with Bacon that it "seems like Disney finally understands how [some viewers] want to watch Marvel movies". In June 2022, Homecoming became available on Disney+ in the United Kingdom and Australia, while Far From Home became available on Disney+ in Japan the following month; both were added to the Disney+ timeline in those territories. By August 2022, The Incredible Hulk was added to the Disney+ timeline in territories it was available in such as Spain and Japan.

By August 2022, Marvel Studios had hired an individual to keep track of the placement of the studio's projects in the MCU timeline. With the release of Thor: Love and Thunder on Disney+ in September 2022, Bacon and his colleague Molly Jae Weinstein noted how the film's placement in the timeline order section on the platform seemed incorrect, with Bacon saying it made "no sense" given dialogue and events in the film that contradicted this placement, and also pointing out how Shang-Chi and Moon Knight placements also ignored dating information given in each. Bacon said, "The MCU's timeline is now complicated by the sheer volume of Marvel films and TV shows currently in production, because even Marvel's key decision-makers don't really know quite what order things will be released." Unlike the earlier phases where each new project was the next chronological title in the timeline, Phase Four "has hopped around the timeline with impunity", which in turn made it "rather messy". Bacon added how viewers have noted the Disney+ timeline was "deeply flawed" with "numerous contradictions". With the release of The Guardians of the Galaxy Holiday Special, Bacon believed its placement on the Disney+ timeline "fixed" Love and Thunder placement, thinking that film should be placed in late 2024 on the timeline. He also pointed out how projects typically appear at the end of the Disney+ timeline, "even when such placements can't possibly be right". In November 2022, Bacon noted how Far From Home appearance in the Disney+ timeline between The Falcon and the Winter Soldier and Shang-Chi could not be correct given story points in each of those projects indicating where they fell in the timeline, and hoped Marvel would correct these mistakes as it had done previously with Black Widow and Black Panther. DK is set to release a book titled Marvel Studios The Marvel Cinematic Universe An Official Timeline on September 5, 2023. The book, written by journalists Anthony Breznican, Amy Ratcliffe, and Rebecca Theodore-Vachon, was made in collaboration with Marvel Studios to provide an updated timeline of the MCU.

As of The Guardians of the Galaxy Holiday Special, the Disney+ timeline order is Captain America: The First Avenger, Agent Carter, Captain Marvel, Iron Man, Iron Man 2, The Incredible Hulk, A Funny Thing Happened on the Way to Thor's Hammer, Thor, The Consultant, The Avengers, Item 47, Thor: The Dark World, Iron Man 3, All Hail the King, Captain America: The Winter Soldier, Guardians of the Galaxy, I Am Groot episode 1, Guardians of the Galaxy Vol. 2, I Am Groot episodes 2–5, Avengers: Age of Ultron, Ant-Man, Captain America: Civil War, Black Widow, Black Panther, Spider-Man: Homecoming, Doctor Strange, Thor: Ragnarok, Ant-Man and the Wasp, Avengers: Infinity War, Avengers: Endgame, Loki, What If...?, WandaVision, The Falcon and the Winter Soldier, Spider-Man: Far From Home, Shang-Chi and the Legend of the Ten Rings, Eternals, Doctor Strange in the Multiverse of Madness, Hawkeye, Moon Knight, Black Panther: Wakanda Forever, She-Hulk: Attorney at Law, Ms. Marvel, Thor: Love and Thunder, Werewolf by Night, and The Guardians of the Galaxy Holiday Special.

Multiverse 

The Official Handbook of the Marvel Universe A to Z, Vol. 5, published in 2008, originally designated the Marvel Cinematic Universe as Earth-199999 within the continuity of Marvel's comic multiverse, a collection of fictional alternate universes, although this designation was rarely used officially outside of the source material. The television series Loki and What If...? were the first to explore the concept of the multiverse within the MCU, as well as the film Spider-Man: No Way Home, which connected the MCU to other Spider-Man film franchises by featuring characters from Sam Raimi's Spider-Man trilogy, Marc Webb's The Amazing Spider-Man films, and Sony's Spider-Man Universe (SSU). The SSU film Venom: Let There Be Carnage briefly featured the main universe of the MCU as well. In Doctor Strange in the Multiverse of Madness, the main universe of MCU events was designated as Earth-616 (a designation first referenced in Spider-Man: Far From Home), sharing the name of the main Marvel Comics universe, while another universe was designated as Earth-838. Phases Four, Five, and Six will comprise "The Multiverse Saga".

Recurring cast and characters 

Additionally, Paul Bettany was the first actor to portray two main characters within the universe, voicing Tony Stark's artificial intelligence J.A.R.V.I.S. in the Iron Man and Avengers films, and portraying Vision in Avengers films, Captain America: Civil War, and the miniseries WandaVision. J. K. Simmons became the first actor to reprise a non-MCU role in the MCU when he appeared as J. Jonah Jameson (a role he played in Sam Raimi's Spider-Man trilogy from 2002 to 2007) in Spider-Man: Far From Home.

Prior to his death in 2018, Stan Lee, creator or co-creator of many of the characters seen in the MCU, made cameo appearances in all of the feature films and television series except Inhumans. In Iron Fist, it is revealed his on-set photograph cameo in the Marvel Netflix series is as NYPD Captain Irving Forbush. His cameo in Guardians of the Galaxy Vol. 2 sees Lee appearing as an informant to the Watchers, discussing previous adventures that include Lee's cameos in other MCU films; he specifically mentions his time as a FedEx delivery man, referring to Lee's cameo in Captain America: Civil War. This acknowledged the fan theory that Lee may be portraying the same character in all his cameos, with writer and director James Gunn noting that "people thought Stan Lee is [Uatu the Watcher] and that all of these cameos are part of him being a Watcher. So, Stan Lee as a guy who is working for the Watchers was something that I thought was fun for the MCU." Feige added that Lee "clearly exists, you know, above and apart from the reality of all the films. So the notion that he could be sitting there on a cosmic pit stop during the jump gate sequence in Guardians...really says, so wait a minute, he's this same character who's popped up in all these films?" Following Lee's death, Marvel Studios chose not to create any new Lee cameos in future projects. NY1 news anchor Pat Kiernan has also appeared in multiple MCU films and television series as himself.

Reception

Early on, the shared universe element of the Marvel Cinematic Universe was criticized by some journalists. Around the release of The Avengers in 2012, Jim Vorel of Herald & Review called the Marvel Cinematic Universe "complicated" and "impressive", but said, "As more and more heroes get their own film adaptations, the overall universe becomes increasingly confusing." Kofi Outlaw of Screen Rant stated that while The Avengers was a success, "Marvel Studios still has room to improve their approach to building a shared movie universe". Some reviewers criticized the fact that the desire to create a shared universe led to films that did not hold as well on their own. In his review of Thor: The Dark World, Forbes critic Scott Mendelson likened the MCU to "a glorified television series", with The Dark World being a "'stand-alone' episode that contains little long-range mythology". Collider's Matt Goldberg considered that while Iron Man 2, Thor and Captain America: The First Avenger were quality productions, "they have never really been their own movies", feeling that the plot detours to S.H.I.E.L.D. or lead-ups to The Avengers dragged down the films' narratives.

The metaphor of the MCU as "the world's biggest TV show" was discussed again, after the release of Captain America: Civil War, by Emily VanDerWerff of Vox, who felt that film in particular highlighted Marvel's success with the model, saying, "Viewed in complete isolation, the plot of Captain America: Civil War makes little to no sense ... [but] when you think about where [Captain America] has been in earlier Marvel films ... his leeriness about being subject to oversight makes a lot more sense." VanDerWerff continued that when thinking about the MCU as a television series, many "common criticisms people tend to level at it take on a new context" such as complaints that the films are formulaic, lack "visual spark", or "shoehorn in story elements" that "are necessary to set up future films", all characteristics that "are fairly typical on television, where a director's influence is much lower than that of the showrunner", in this case, Feige. Comparing the films to the series Game of Thrones specifically, VanDerWerff noted that each solo film checks "in on various characters and their individual side stories, before bringing everyone together in the finale (or, rather, an Avengers film)", with Guardians of the Galaxy being equivalent to the character Daenerys Targaryen—"both separated by long distances from everybody else". She noted that this format was an extension of early "TV-like" film franchises such as Star Wars, as well as the format of the comics upon which the films are based. "I say all of this not to suggest that film franchises resembling TV series is necessarily a good trend", VanDerWerff concluded, "For as much as I generally enjoy the Marvel movies, I'm disheartened by the possibility that their particular form might take over the film industry ... But I also don't think it's the end of the world if Marvel continues on ... there's a reason TV has stolen so much of the cultural conversation over the past few decades. There's something legitimately exciting about the way the medium tells stories when it's good, and if nothing else, Marvel's success shows the film world could learn from that."

Following the conclusion of season one of Agents of S.H.I.E.L.D., Mary McNamara at the Los Angeles Times praised the connections between that series and the films, stating that "never before has television been literally married to film, charged with filling in the back story and creating the connective tissue of an ongoing film franchise ... [Agents of S.H.I.E.L.D.] is now not only a very good show in its own right, it's part of Marvel's multiplatform city-state. It faces a future of perpetual re-invention, and that puts it in the exhilarating first car of television's roller-coaster ride toward possible world domination." Terri Schwartz of Zap2it agreed with this sentiment, stating that "the fact that [Captain America: The Winter Soldier] so influenced the show is game-changing in terms of how the mediums of film and television can be interwoven", though "the fault there seems to be that Agents of S.H.I.E.L.D. had to bide time until The Winter Soldier release", which led to much criticism.

In January 2015, Michael Doran of Newsarama and Graeme McMillian of The Hollywood Reporter had a "point-counterpoint" debate in response to the first Ant-Man trailer. McMillian responded, "at this point, Marvel's brand is such that I'm not sure it can offer up something like [the trailer]  it seeming like a crushing disappointment ... part of Marvel's brand is that it  offer the kind of run-of-the-mill superhero movie that you're talking about, that it's ... at least different enough to tweak and play with the genre somehow ... The fact that there's such upset about this trailer being ... well, okay ... suggests to me that the audience  expecting something to knock their socks off." Doran concluded, "That does seem to be the point here—the expectations fans now have for everything Marvel Studios ... [and] Marvel  going to eventually falter."

After seeing the portrayal of Yellowjacket in Ant-Man, the antagonist of the film, McMillian noted, 

Following the release of Jessica Jones, David Priest at CNET wrote about how the series rescues "Marvel from itself ... Jessica Jones takes big steps forward in terms of theme, craft and diversity. It's a good story first, and a superhero show second. And for the first time, the MCU seems like it matters. Our culture needs stories like this. Here's hoping Marvel keeps them coming." For Paul Tassi and Erik Kain of Forbes, watching the series made them question the MCU, with Kain feeling that the "morally complex, violent, dark world of Jessica Jones has no place in the MCU ... right now, the MCU is holding back shows like Jessica Jones and Daredevil, while those shows are contributing absolutely nothing to the MCU." Tassi went so far as to wonder what "the point of the Marvel Cinematic Universe" is, lamenting the lack of major crossovers in the franchise since the Winter Soldier reveal on Agents of S.H.I.E.L.D., and saying that Jessica Jones is "so far removed from the world of The Avengers, it might as well not be in the same universe at all ... [I] really don't understand the point of [the MCU] if they're going to keep everything within it separated off in these little boxes". Conversely, Eric Francisco of Inverse called Jessica Jones lack of overt connections to the MCU "the show's chief advantage. Besides demonstrating how physically wide open the MCU's scope really is, Jessica Jones also proves the MCU's thematic durability."

In April 2016, Marvel Studios revealed that Alfre Woodard would appear in Captain America: Civil War, having already been cast as Mariah Dillard in Luke Cage the previous year. This "raised hopes that Marvel could be uniting its film and Netflix universes", with "one of the first and strongest connections" between the two. Civil War writers Christopher Markus and Stephen McFeely revealed that Woodard would instead be portraying Miriam Sharpe in the film, explaining that she had been cast on the suggestion of Robert Downey, Jr., and they had not learned of her casting in Luke Cage until afterwards. This was not the first instance of actors being cast in multiple roles in the MCU, but this casting was called more "significant", and seen by many as a "disappointing" indication of "the growing divide" and "lack of more satisfying cooperation" between Marvel Studios and Marvel Television following the September 2015 corporate reshuffling of Marvel Entertainment.

Speaking to the 1990s setting of Captain Marvel, "the MCU's first full period piece since Phase One's Captain America: The First Avenger in 2011", Richard Newby of The Hollywood Reporter felt the return of younger versions of some characters introduced and killed in earlier films "open[ed] up the MCU in a whole new way and broaden[ed] the franchise's mantra of 'it's all connected. Speaking specifically to Clark Gregg's appearance as Agent Phil Coulson in the film, Newby noted the appearance "doesn't exactly mend fences between Marvel's film and TV divisions, [but] it does strengthen the connective tissue and the sense that these characters still matter in the grand scheme of Marvel's film plans". He also hoped that continuity from Agents of S.H.I.E.L.D. would be maintained in Captain Marvel, especially since Coulson has dealt with the Kree in the series. Newby also added that shifting to different time periods would help Marvel Studios "sustain this cinematic universe for the next 10 years" by allowing them to repeat some of the genres previously used, as they could then feel "fresh" and have "different rules and different restraints," as well as allow them to build upon material established in the television series such as Agent Carter. He concluded, 

Likewise, in his review of Avengers: Endgame, Joe Morgenstern of The Wall Street Journal acknowledged the unique achievement that the Marvel Cinematic Universe had accomplished:

Many famous filmmakers expressed different views both on the success and quality of MCU. In October 2019, filmmaker Martin Scorsese openly criticized Marvel films in an interview and during a David Lean lecture in London, later expanded in an op-ed in The New York Times, asserting that these films are not cinema, but are instead the equivalent of theme park rides that lack "mystery, revelation or genuine emotional danger". He also stated that such films are corporation products that have been "market-researched, audience-tested, vetted, modified, revetted and remodified until they're ready for consumption", and that the invasion of such "theme park" films in theaters crowded out films by other directors. Scorsese's remarks were dismissed by directors of MCU films such as Joss Whedon and James Gunn, while they were defended by Francis Ford Coppola, who described the potential effect of Marvel films in the film industry as "despicable". In September 2021, director Denis Villeneuve noted that Marvel films "are nothing more than a 'cut and paste' of others" that have "turned us into zombies a bit". In February 2022, director Roland Emmerich felt large blockbuster films such as the MCU and Star Wars films were "ruining our industry a little", since "nobody does anything original anymore". Conversely, George Miller stated, "To me, it's all cinema. I don't think you can ghettoize it and say, oh this is cinema or that is cinema. It applies to all the arts, to literature, the performing arts, painting and music, in all its form. It's such a broad spectrum, a wide range and to say that anyone is more significant or more important than the other, is missing the point. It's one big mosaic and each bit of work fits into it."

Marvel's American audience was studied by Morning Consult in 2021, which found that only 9% of Marvel's fan base is Gen Z, 64% of fans are White adults, and 42% of fans live in suburban areas.

Cultural impact

Other studios 
After the release of The Avengers in May 2012, Tom Russo of Boston.com noted that aside from the occasional "novelty" such as Alien vs. Predator (2004), the idea of a shared universe was virtually unheard of in Hollywood. Since that time, the shared universe model created by Marvel Studios has begun to be replicated by other film studios that held rights to other comic book characters. In April 2014, Tuna Amobi, a media analyst for Standard & Poor's Equity Research Services, stated that in the previous three to five years, Hollywood studios began planning "megafranchises" for years to come, opposed to working one blockbuster at a time. Amobi added, "A lot of these superhero characters were just being left there to gather dust. Disney has proved that this [approach and genre] can be a gold mine." With more studios now "playing the megafranchise game", Doug Creutz, media analyst for Cowen and Company, feels the allure will eventually die for audiences: "If Marvel's going to make two or three films a year, and Warner Brothers is going to do at least a film every year, and Sony's going to do a film every year, and Fox [is] going to do a film every year, can everyone do well in that scenario? I'm not sure they can."

In March 2018, Patrick Shanley of The Hollywood Reporter opined that "the key differences between a regular franchise, such as The Fast and the Furious or Pitch Perfect films, and a shared universe is the amount of planning and interweaving that goes into each individual film. Its all too easy to make a film that exists solely for the purpose of setting up future installments and expanding a world, rather than a film that stands on its own merits while deftly hinting or winking at its place in the larger mythos. In that, the MCU has flourished." He felt that Iron Man "itself was aimed at being an enjoyable stand-alone experience, not as an overall advertisement for 17 subsequent movies. That mentality has persisted through most of the MCU films over the past decade, which is all the more impressive as its roster of heroes now exceeds the two-dozen mark."

DC Entertainment and Warner Bros. Pictures 

In October 2012, following its legal victory over Joe Shuster's estate for the rights to Superman, Warner Bros. Pictures announced that it planned to move ahead with its long-awaited Justice League film, uniting such DC Comics superheroes as Batman, Superman, and Wonder Woman. The company was expected to take the opposite approach to Marvel, releasing individual films for the characters after they have appeared in a team-up film. The release of Man of Steel in 2013 was intended to be the start of a new shared universe for DC, "laying the groundwork for the future slate of films based on DC Comics". In 2014, Warner Bros. announced that slate of films, similarly to Disney and Marvel claiming dates for films years in advance. That year, DC chief creative officer Geoff Johns stated that the television series Arrow and The Flash were set in a separate universe from the new film one, later clarifying that "We look at it as the multiverse. We have our TV universe and our film universe, but they all co-exist. For us, creatively, it's about allowing everyone to make the best possible product, to tell the best story, to do the best world. Everyone has a vision and you really want to let the visions shine through ... It's just a different approach [to Marvel's]."

Discussing the apparent failure of the cinematic universe's first team-up film, Batman v Superman: Dawn of Justice (2016), to establish a successful equivalent to the MCU, Emily VanDerWerff noted that where the MCU has a television-like "showrunner" in Feige, "the visionary behind Marvel's entire slate", the DCEU has director Zack Snyder, whose DC films "seemingly start from the assumption that people have come not to see an individual story but a long series of teases for other ones. It's like he knows what he needs to do but can't focus on the task at hand. TV certainly isn't immune to that problem, but shows that get caught up in high-concept premises and big-picture thinking before doing the necessary legwork to establish characters and their relationships tend to be canceled." Subsequently, in May 2016, Warner Bros. gave oversight of the DCEU to Johns and executive Jon Berg in an attempt to "unify the disparate elements of the DC movies" and emulate Marvel's success. The two were made producers on the Justice League films, on top of Johns' involvement in several "solo" films, such as the post-production process of Suicide Squad (2016) or the writing process of a standalone Batman film. After the successful release of Wonder Woman in June 2017, DC decided to begin deemphasizing the shared nature of their films, with DC Entertainment president Diane Nelson stating, "Our intention, certainly, moving forward is using the continuity to help make sure nothing is diverging in a way that doesn't make sense, but there's no insistence upon an overall story line or interconnectivity in that universe... Moving forward, you'll see the DC movie universe being a universe, but one that comes from the heart of the filmmaker who's creating them." Additionally, DC began focusing on films "completely separate from everything else, set entirely outside" the DCEU as part of a new label, with the first film centered on the Joker. In August 2022, Warner Bros. Discovery CEO David Zaslav announced a 10-year plan for the DC Extended Universe similar to the one that Horn and Iger employed with Feige for the MCU, with James Gunn and Peter Safran appointed in October 2022 to serve as the co-chairmen and co-CEOs of the newly formed DC Studios to develop a new DC shared universe, the first content for which was announced in January 2023 for the DC Universe.

20th Century Fox 

In November 2012, 20th Century Fox announced plans to create their own shared universe, consisting of Marvel properties that it holds the rights to including the Fantastic Four and X-Men, with the hiring of Mark Millar as supervising producer. Millar said, "Fox are thinking, 'We're sitting on some really awesome things here. There is another side of the Marvel Universe. Let's try and get some cohesiveness going.' So they brought me in to oversee that really. To meet with the writers and directors to suggest new ways we could take this stuff and new properties that could spin out of it." X-Men: Days of Future Past, released in 2014, was Fox's first step towards expanding their stable of Marvel properties and creating this universe, ahead of the release of a Fantastic Four reboot film the next year. In May 2014, Days of Future Past and Fantastic Four screenwriter Simon Kinberg stated that the latter film would not take place in the same universe as the X-Men films, explaining that "none of the X-Men movies have acknowledged the notion of a sort of superhero team—the Fantastic Four. And the Fantastic Four acquire powers, so for them to live in a world where mutants are prevalent is kind of complicated, because you're like, 'Oh, you're just a mutant.' Like, 'What's so fantastic about you?' ... they live in discrete universes." In July 2015, X-Men director Bryan Singer said that there was still potential for a crossover between the X-Men and Fantastic Four franchises, if reactions to Fantastic Four and X-Men: Apocalypse warranted it.

Feeling that Singer's efforts in Apocalypse to establish a larger world, similar to the MCU, did not meet the standards established by Marvel, VanDerWerff noted that unlike Feige's ability to serve as "pseudo-showrunner", Singer is instead "steeped in film and the way movie stories have always been told", so "when it comes time to have Apocalypse dovetail with story threads from the earlier X-Men: First Class", which was directed by Matthew Vaughn, "both Singer's direction and Simon Kinberg's script rely on hackneyed devices and clumsy storytelling", indicating a lack of "the kind of big-picture thinking this sort of mega franchise requires". In his review of Dark Phoenix, Joe Morgenstern of The Wall Street Journal characterized the entire X-Men film series as being a "notoriously erratic franchise." In March 2019, the film rights of Deadpool, the X-Men characters, and the Fantastic Four characters returned to Marvel Studios following the Walt Disney Company's acquisition of 21st Century Fox.

Sony Pictures 

In November 2013, Sony Pictures Entertainment Co-Chairman Amy Pascal announced that the studio intended to expand their universe created within Marc Webb's The Amazing Spider-Man series, with spin-off adventures for supporting characters, in an attempt to replicate Marvel and Disney's model. The next month, Sony announced Venom and Sinister Six films, both set in the Amazing Spider-Man universe. With this announcement, IGN stated that the spin-offs are "the latest example of what we can refer to as "the Avengers effect" in Hollywood, as studios work to build interlocking movie universes." Sony chose not to replicate the Marvel Studios model of introducing individual characters first before bringing them together in a team-up film, instead making the Spider-Man adversaries the stars of future films. In February 2015, Sony Pictures and Marvel Studios announced that the Spider-Man franchise would be retooled, with a new film co-produced by Feige and Pascal being released in July 2017, and the character being integrated into the MCU. Sony Pictures would continue to finance, distribute, own, and have final creative control of the Spider-Man films. With this announcement, sequels to The Amazing Spider-Man 2 (2014) were canceled, and by November 2015 the Venom and Sinister Six films, as well as spin-offs based on female characters in the Spider-Man universe, were no longer moving forward. By March 2016, the Venom film had itself been retooled, to start its own franchise unrelated to the MCU Spider-Man. A year later, Sony officially announced the Venom film to be in development, for an October 5, 2018 release, along with a film centered on the characters Silver Sable and Black Cat known as Silver & Black. Both projects were not intended to be a part of the MCU nor spin-offs to Spider-Man: Homecoming, but rather part of an intended separate shared universe known as the Sony's Spider-Man Universe (SSU). The mid-credits scene of Venom: Let There Be Carnage (2021) hinted at Eddie Brock / Venom joining the MCU, which was confirmed with the release of Spider-Man: No Way Home (2021) through an uncredited cameo appearance in its mid-credits scene. Spider-Man: No Way Home also featured the Spider-Man iterations from Sam Raimi and Webb's Spider-Man films, respectively reprised by Tobey Maguire and Andrew Garfield.

After Sony canceled their shared universe plans and started sharing the Spider-Man character with Marvel Studios, multiple critics discussed their failure at replicating the MCU. Scott Meslow of The Week noted the perceived flaws of the first Amazing Spider-Man film, outside of its lead performances, and how the sequel "doubles down on all the missteps of the original while adding a few of its own. …We now have a textbook example of how not to reboot a superhero franchise, and if Sony and Marvel are wise, they'll take virtually all those lessons to heart as they chart Spider-Man's next course." Scott Mendelson noted that The Amazing Spider-Man 2 "was sold as less a sequel to The Amazing Spider-Man than a backdoor pilot for Spider-Man vs. the Sinister Six. …Had Sony stuck with the original plan of a scaled-down superhero franchise, one that really was rooted in romantic drama, they would have at least stuck out in a crowded field of superhero franchises. When every superhero film is now going bigger, Amazing Spider-Man could have distinguished itself by going small and intimate." This would have saved Sony "a boatload of money", and potentially reversed the film's relative financial failure.

Academia 
In September 2014, the University of Baltimore announced a course beginning in the 2015 spring semester revolving around the Marvel Cinematic Universe, to be taught by Arnold T. Blumberg. "Media Genres: Media Marvels" examines "how Marvel's series of interconnected films and television shows, plus related media and comic book sources and Joseph Campbell's monomyth of the 'hero's journey', offer important insights into modern culture" as well as Marvel's efforts "to establish a viable universe of plotlines, characters, and backstories."

Outside media

Avengers Campus 

After the acquisition by Disney in 2009, Marvel films began to be marketed at the Innoventions attraction in Tomorrowland at Disneyland. For Iron Man 3, the exhibit, entitled "Iron Man Tech Presented by Stark Industries", featured the same armor display that was shown at the 2012 San Diego Comic-Con, with the Marks I-VII and the new Mark XLII. In addition, there was a simulator game, titled "Become Iron Man", that used Kinect-like technology to allow the viewer to be encased in an animated Mark XLII armor and take part in a series of "tests," in which you fire repulsor rays and fly through Tony Stark's workshop. The game was guided by J.A.R.V.I.S., who is voiced again by Paul Bettany. The exhibit also had smaller displays that included helmets and chest pieces from the earlier films and the gauntlet and boot from an action sequence in Iron Man 3. The exhibit for Thor: The Dark World was called "Thor: Treasures of Asgard", and featured displays of Asgardian relics and transports guests to Odin's throne room, where they were greeted by Thor. Captain America: The Winter Soldier exhibit, "Captain America: The Living Legend and Symbol of Courage", featured a meet and greet experience.

From May to September 2017, Disneyland Resort featured the "Summer of Heroes", which sees members of the Guardians and Avengers making appearances throughout the Disneyland Resort. Additionally, the Guardians of the Galaxy: Awesome Dance Off event was featured, which involved Peter Quill / Star-Lord blasting music from his boombox, along with the Avengers Training Initiative, a limited experience where Black Widow and Hawkeye "assemble a group of young recruits to see if they have what it takes to be an Avenger." Marvel-related food and merchandise was also available throughout Hollywood Land at Disney California Adventure during the "Summer of Heroes".

In March 2018, the Walt Disney Company announced three new Marvel-themed areas inspired by the MCU to Disney California Adventure, Walt Disney Studios Paris, and Hong Kong Disneyland. The developments will be designed by Walt Disney Imagineering in collaboration with Marvel Studios and Marvel Themed Entertainment. As was established with Guardians of the Galaxy – Mission: Breakout!, Avengers Campus exists in its own theme park universe that is inspired by the MCU. Being in the MCU multiverse, Avengers Campus has a shared history with the MCU proper, with a few notable exceptions being the Blip from Avengers: Infinity War did not occur, and some characters who died, such as Tony Stark, are still alive.

Hong Kong Disneyland 
In October 2013, the Iron Man Experience attraction was announced for Hong Kong Disneyland. It is set in the Tomorrowland section of the park, with the area built to look like a new Stark Expo created by Tony Stark after the 2010 one, as seen in Iron Man 2, with various exhibit halls that include the Mark III armor from the films. The area also has Iron Man and Marvel-themed merchandise items and memorabilia, plus an interactive game where guests can have the chance to try on Iron Man's armor. Iron Man Experience sees guests assist Iron Man in defeating Hydra throughout Hong Kong, and opened on January 11, 2017.

In March 2018, the Walt Disney Company announced a new Marvel-themed area inspired by the MCU to Hong Kong Disneyland and a new attraction where guests team up with Ant-Man and the Wasp, to join Iron Man Experience. Inspired by Ant-Man and the Wasp, Ant-Man and The Wasp: Nano Battle! is an enclosed interactive dark ride that sees guests use laser powered weapons to team up with Ant-Man and the Wasp to defeat Arnim Zola and his army of Hydra swarm bots. Ant Man and the Wasp: Nano Battle! replaces the Buzz Lightyear Astro Blasters ride, and opened on March 31, 2019.

Disney California Adventure 
By San Diego Comic-Con 2016, the Tower of Terror at Disney California Adventure was set to be replaced by a new attraction, Guardians of the Galaxy – Mission: Breakout!. Chris Pratt, Zoe Saldaña, Dave Bautista and Benicio del Toro all filmed exclusive footage for the attraction, reprising their roles as Peter Quill / Star-Lord, Gamora, Drax and Taneleer Tivan / The Collector, respectively. James Gunn, director of Guardians of the Galaxy and its sequel, directed footage for the attraction and consulted on all aspects of it. Guardians of the Galaxy – Mission: Breakout! sees visitors assisting Rocket to rescue the other Guardians from the Collector's fortress, while the attraction features randomized events during the experience and music inspired by the Awesome Mix Vol. 1 soundtrack. The attraction opened on May 27, 2017.

In March 2018, the Walt Disney Company announced a new Marvel-themed area inspired by the MCU at Disney California Adventure, anchored by Mission: Breakout!, that sees characters from the MCU such as Iron Man and Spider-Man join the Guardians of the Galaxy in a "completely immersive superhero universe." The area replaced the "A Bug's Land" area, which closed in mid-2018 to start construction on the Marvel area. Tom Holland reprises his role as Peter Parker / Spider-Man in the attraction Web Slingers: A Spider-Man Adventure, in which Parker has set up W.E.B. (the Worldwide Engineers Brigade) to inspire a new generation to use technology to save the world. Riders are recruited by Spider-Man into the initiative to stop his malfunctioning Spider-Bots. Web Slingers was directed by Spider-Man director Jon Watts along with Brett Strong, and was written by Steven Spiegel and featured visual effects by Framestore. A one-act version of Rogers: The Musical will premiere at the Hyperion Theater in mid-2023 for a limited time.

Walt Disney Studios Park 
In March 2018, the Walt Disney Company announced a new Marvel-themed area inspired by the MCU to Disneyland Paris' Walt Disney Studios Park. The area includes a reimagined attraction where riders team up with Iron Man and other Avengers on a "hyper-kinetic adventure" on July 20, 2022. The park also hosted the "Summer of Super Heroes" live-action stage show from June–September 2018.

Disney Wish 

In July 2021, the immersive family dining experience "Avengers: Quantum Encounter" at the Worlds of Marvel restaurant on the Disney Wish cruise line was announced, which debuted when the cruise began voyages on July 14, 2022. The experience takes place during dinner with interactive elements and a full CGI recreation of the Wish upper decks. Paul Rudd, Evangeline Lilly, Anthony Mackie, Brie Larson, Kerry Condon, and Iman Vellani reprised their MCU roles, while Ross Marquand voiced Ultron after previously doing so in What If...?, in which he replaced James Spader. Chris Waitt directed Rudd and Lilly's content, which was written by Steven Spiegel and featured visual effects by Framestore. The Marvels director Nia DaCosta filmed Vellani and Larson's content in London ahead of principal photography for the film.

Other live attractions

Avengers S.T.A.T.I.O.N. 
In May 2014, the Avengers S.T.A.T.I.O.N. (Scientific Training and Tactical Intelligence Operative Network) exhibit opened at the Discovery Times Square center. The exhibit features replica set pieces, as well as actual props from the films, mixed with interactive technology and information, crafted through a partnership with NASA and other scientists. Titus Welliver also provides a "debrief" to visitors, reprising his role as S.H.I.E.L.D. agent Felix Blake. Created by Victory Hill Exhibits, Avengers S.T.A.T.I.O.N. cost $7.5 million to create, and ran through early September 2015.

The exhibit also opened in South Korea at the War Memorial of Korea in April 2015, in Paris, France, at Esplanade de La Défense a year later, and in Las Vegas at the Treasure Island Hotel and Casino in June 2016. The Las Vegas version of the exhibit featured updated character details and corresponding science to incorporate the Marvel films that have released since the original exhibit in New York. Additionally, the Las Vegas version features Cobie Smulders reprising her role as Maria Hill to "debrief" visitors, replacing Welliver.

GOMA exhibit 
An art exhibit, titled Marvel: Creating the Cinematic Universe, was displayed exclusively at the Queensland Gallery of Modern Art (GOMA) from May to September 2017. The exhibit, which included "300 plus objects, films, costumes, drawings and other ephemera", featured content "from the collection of Marvel Studios and Marvel Entertainment and private collections" with "significant focus [given] to the creative artists who translate the drawn narrative to the screen through production design and storyboarding, costume and prop design, and special effects and post-production". Marvel: Creating the Cinematic Universe was also extended to GOMA's Australian Cinémathèque with a retrospective of the MCU films.

Avengers: Damage Control 
In October 2019, Marvel Studios and ILMxLAB announced the virtual reality experience Avengers: Damage Control. The experience would be available for a limited time starting in mid-October 2019 at select Void VR locations. Avengers: Damage Control sees players taking control of one of Shuri's Emergency Response Suits–which combine Wakandan and Stark Industries technologies–to defeat a threat alongside Doctor Strange, Ant-Man, and the Wasp. Letitia Wright, Benedict Cumberbatch, Paul Rudd, and Evangeline Lilly all reprise their MCU roles, while Ross Marquand voices Ultron, replacing James Spader. The experience was extended to the end of 2019.

Live-action specials

Marvel Studios: Assembling a Universe (2014) 
On March 18, 2014, ABC aired a one-hour television special titled Marvel Studios: Assembling a Universe, which documented the history of Marvel Studios and the development of the Marvel Cinematic Universe and included exclusive interviews and behind-the-scenes footage from all of the films, One-Shots, and Agents of S.H.I.E.L.D., and sneak peeks of Avengers: Age of Ultron, Captain America: The Winter Soldier, Guardians of the Galaxy, unaired episodes of Agents of S.H.I.E.L.D., and Ant-Man. Brian Lowry of Variety felt the special, "contains a pretty interesting business and creative story. While it might all make sense in hindsight, there was appreciable audacity in Marvel's plan to release five loosely connected movies from the same hero-filled world, beginning with the cinematically unproven Iron Man and culminating with superhero team The Avengers. As such, this fast-moving hour qualifies as more than just a cut-and-paste job from electronic press kits, although there's an element of that, certainly." The special was released on September 9, 2014, on the home media for Agents of S.H.I.E.L.D. season 1.

Marvel 75 Years: From Pulp to Pop! (2014) 
In September 2014, Agents of S.H.I.E.L.D. executive producer Jeffrey Bell stated that in order to meet production demands and avoid having to air repeat episodes, ABC would likely air a Marvel special in place of a regular installment at some point during the first ten episodes of Agents of S.H.I.E.L.D. second season. In October, the special was revealed to be Marvel 75 Years: From Pulp to Pop!, which was hosted by Emily VanCamp, who portrays Agent 13 in Captain America: The Winter Soldier, and aired on November 4, 2014. The special features behind the scenes footage from Avengers: Age of Ultron and Ant-Man, as well as footage from the Agent Carter television series previously screened at New York Comic-Con. Brian Lowry of Variety felt an hour for the special did not "do the topic justice" adding, "For anyone who has seen more than one Marvel movie but would shrug perplexedly at the mention of Jack Kirby or Steve Ditko, Marvel 75 Years: From Pulp To Pop! should probably be required viewing. Fun, fast-paced and encompassing many of the company's highlights along with a few lowlights, it's a solid primer on Marvel's history, while weaving in inevitable self-promotion and synergistic plugs." Eric Goldman of IGN also wished the special had been longer, adding, "Understandably, the more you already know about Marvel, the less you'll be surprised by Marvel 75 Years: From Pulp to Pop!, but it's important to remember who this special is really made for – a mainstream audience who have embraced the Marvel characters, via the hugely successful movies, in a way no one could have imagined."

Marvel Studios: Expanding the Universe (2019) 
In November 2019, Disney+ announced that the streaming platform would include Expanding the Universe, a special that features a look at the original MCU TV series for Disney+, with interviews and concept art.

Bilibili New Year's Gala (2020) 
A Marvel-themed orchestra performance of an extended version of Brian Tyler's Marvel Studios theme and Alan Silvestri's theme from The Avengers took place during China's Bilibili New Year's Gala on December 31, 2020, to promote the 2021 Marvel Studios film releases.

Marvel Studios' 2021 Disney+ Day Special (2021) 
A special titled Marvel Studios' 2021 Disney+ Day Special, which looked at the future of the MCU on Disney+, was released on the service on November 12, 2021, as part of its "Disney+ Day" celebration.

Stan Lee (2023) 
A special titled Stan Lee, chronicling the life and legacy of Stan Lee, will be released in 2023 on Disney+.

Documentary series

Marvel Studios: Legends (2021–present) 

Announced in December 2020, this series examines individual heroes, villains, moments, and objects from the Marvel Cinematic Universe and how they connect, in anticipation of the upcoming stories that will feature them in Phase Four. Marvel Studios: Legends premiered on Disney+ on January 8, 2021, with the release of the first two episodes. Additional episodes were released ahead of a character and objects' appearances in Disney+ series and films.

Marvel Studios: Assembled (2021–present) 

Announced in February 2021, each special of the documentary series goes behind the scenes of the making of the MCU films and television series with cast members and additional creatives. Marvel Studios: Assembled premiered on Disney+ on March 12, 2021, with the release of the first special, followed by additional specials.

Voices Rising: The Music of Wakanda Forever (2023) 

Voices Rising: The Music of Wakanda Forever is a three-part documentary series detailing the creation process of Black Panther: Wakanda Forever soundtrack. It premiered on Disney+ on February 28, 2023.

MPower (2023) 
In June 2021, Marvel Studios released a casting call for fans of "Marvel's strong women" to be a part of an upcoming Disney+ documentary series showcasing the women who create the MCU in front of and behind the camera. The series was titled MPower by February 2023 and premiered in its entirety on March 8, 2023, consisting of four episodes titled "The Women of Black Panther", "Captain Marvel", "Scarlet Witch", and "Gamora".

Literary material 
In September 2015, Marvel announced the Guidebook to the Marvel Cinematic Universe, named as a nod to the Official Handbook of the Marvel Universe. Each guidebook is compiled by Mike O'Sullivan and the Official Handbook of the Marvel Universe team, with cover art from Mike del Mundo and Pascal Campion, and features facts about the MCU films, film-to-comic comparisons, and production stills. Guidebook to the Marvel Cinematic Universe: Marvel's Iron Man, Guidebook to the Marvel Cinematic Universe: Marvel's Incredible Hulk / Marvel's Iron Man 2, Guidebook to the Marvel Cinematic Universe: Marvel's Thor, and Guidebook to the Marvel Cinematic Universe: Marvel's Captain America: The First Avenger released each month from October 2015 to January 2016, respectively.

In November 2018, Marvel and Titan Publishing Group released Marvel Studios: The First Ten Years to celebrate the first ten years of the Marvel Cinematic Universe which featured cast interviews, in-depth sections on each film, and an Easter egg guide. In October 2021, a two-volume book The Story of Marvel Studios: The Making of the Marvel Cinematic Universe was released, written by Tara Bennett and Paul Terry. This collection features a look at the evolution of Marvel Studios, personal stories from the 23-film "Infinity Saga", and interviews with cast and crew members.

Video game tie-ins

A Mini Marvel 
In February 2016, a commercial for Coca-Cola mini cans aired during Super Bowl 50. A Mini Marvel was created by Wieden+Kennedy for Coca-Cola through a partnership with Marvel, and was directed by the Russo brothers. In the ad, Ant-Man (voiced by Paul Rudd, reprising his role) and the Hulk first fight, and then bond, over a Coke mini can. Luma Pictures provided visual effects for the spot, having worked previously with the two characters in MCU films. For the Hulk, Luma redefined its previous muscular system and simulation process to create and render the character, while Ant-Man received new motion capture. The Super Bowl campaign extended to "limited-edition Coke mini cans [six packs] that are emblazoned with images of Marvel characters, including Hulk, Ant-Man, Black Widow, [Falcon, Iron Man] and Captain America." Consumers had the opportunity to purchase the cans by finding hidden clues in the commercial, though "if the program goes well, Coke will consider making the cans available in stores." The ad had the third most social media activity of all the film-related trailers that aired during the game, and was nominated for Outstanding Visual Effects in a Commercial at the 15th Visual Effects Society Awards.

The Good, the Bart, and the Loki 

In June 2021, The Simpsons short film The Good, the Bart, and the Loki was announced, which released alongside "Journey into Mystery", the fifth episode of Loki on Disney+. The short sees Loki teaming up with Bart Simpson in a crossover that pays homage to the heroes and villains of the MCU. Hiddleston reprises his role as Loki in the short.

See also 
 Features of the Marvel Cinematic Universe

Notes

References

External links 
 Marvel Cinematic Universe Wiki
 MCU timeline: How to watch all 23 Marvel movies in the perfect order
 

 
Continuity (fiction)
Fictional universes
Film series based on Marvel Comics
Cinematic Universe
Marvel Entertainment franchises
Mass media franchises introduced in 2008
Mythopoeia
Walt Disney Studios (division) franchises